Monoacylglycerol O-acyltransferase 3 is a protein that in humans is encoded by the MOGAT3 gene.

Function 

Acyl-CoA:monoacylglycerol acyltransferase (MOGAT; EC 2.3.1.22) catalyzes the synthesis of diacylglycerol from 2-monoacylglycerol and fatty acyl-CoA.

References

Further reading